Border Devils is a 1932 American Western film directed by William Nigh and starring Harry Carey, Kathleen Collins, and Gabby Hayes.

Cast
 Harry Carey as Jim Gray
 Kathleen Collins as Marcia Brandon
 Gabby Hayes as Dude Sanders
 Niles Welch as Tom Hope
 Olive Carey as Ethel Denham
 Albert J. Smith as Inspector Bell
 Merrill McCormick as Jose Lopez
 Art Mix as Bud Brandon
 Tetsu Komai as The General

Plot
A man, Jim Gray (Carey), is wrongly condemned and put in jail; he escapes to prove his innocence and reveal the real criminal. In the process, Gray discovers a second criminal who has been working behind the scenes with the more obvious villain.

References

External links
 Border Devils at IMDb.com
 

1932 films
1932 Western (genre) films
American Western (genre) films
American black-and-white films
Films directed by William Nigh
Films with screenplays by Harry L. Fraser
1930s English-language films
1930s American films